This is a list seasons played by AFC Ajax Vrouwen, the women's section of the Dutch football club AFC Ajax, since its establishment in 2012.

Summary

References

women's seasons
women
Ajax Women
Ajax